Yannick Nézet-Séguin, CC (born Yannick Séguin; 6 March 1975) is a Canadian (Québécois) conductor and pianist.  He is currently music director of the Orchestre Métropolitain (Montréal), the Metropolitan Opera, and the Philadelphia Orchestra.  He was also principal conductor of the Rotterdam Philharmonic Orchestra from 2008 to 2018.

Biography

Early years
Nézet-Séguin was born in Montreal on 6 March 1975 to two specialists in education, Serge P. Séguin, PhD, a university professor, and Claudine Nézet, M.A., a university lecturer and coordinator. He began to study piano at age five, with Jeanne-d'Arc Lebrun-Lussier, and decided to become an orchestra conductor at age ten.

Nézet-Séguin studied successively at St-Isaac-Jogues Primary School, at Collège Mont-Saint-Louis Secondary School and at Bois-de-Boulogne College. In the meantime, he was admitted to Anisia Campos's piano class, at the Conservatoire de musique du Québec where he earned five first prizes in piano and in four related musical subjects. He also studied choral conducting with Joseph Flummerfelt at the Westminster Choir College in Princeton, New Jersey, and did many master classes with renowned conductors (George Benjamin, Roberto Carnevale, Daniele Gatti).

Early career
At 19, he met and was invited to follow Carlo Maria Giulini in rehearsals and concerts for more than a year. He became the musical director of the Chœur polyphonique de Montréal in 1994 and obtained the same post at Choeur de Laval in 1995. In 1995, he founded his own professional orchestral and vocal ensemble, La Chapelle de Montréal, with whom he performed two to four concerts a year until 2002. He considers Charles Dutoit as his first inspiration as a child and Carlo Maria Giulini as his master. From 1998 to 2002, Nézet-Séguin was chorus master and assistant conductor of the Opéra de Montréal. Maestro Nézet-Séguin made his American conducting debut in 2002 at Sarasota Opera conducting Mozart's "Così fan tutte."

Orchestre Métropolitain
Nézet-Séguin became music director of the Orchestre Métropolitain (Montréal) in 2000, and principal guest conductor of the Victoria Symphony (British Columbia, Canada) in 2003. His most recent contract with the Orchestre Métropolitain, through 2010, has since been extended through 2015. In September 2015, the orchestra announced a further extension of his contract through the 2020–21 season. In September 2019, the orchestra announced its contract with Nézet-Séguin as a lifetime contract. He has conducted commercial recordings of symphonies of Anton Bruckner and Gustav Mahler with the Orchestre Métropolitain.

Rotterdam Philharmonic Orchestra
In 2005, Nézet-Séguin guest-conducted the Rotterdam Philharmonic Orchestra (RPhO) for the first time, and returned in 2006. In December 2006, the RPhO announced the appointment of Nézet-Séguin as their 11th Principal Conductor, by a unanimous vote, starting with the 2008–09 concert season, with an initial contract of 4 years. In April 2010, the RPhO announced the extension of his contract through 2015. With the RPhO, Nézet-Séguin has recorded commercially for Virgin Classics and for EMI. In June 2013, the RPhO further extended his contract through the summer of 2018. In May 2015, the RPhO announced the conclusion of Nézet-Séguin's tenure as RPhO principal conductor at the end of the 2017–2018 season. He now has the title of Eredirigent (honorary conductor) of the RPhO.

Philadelphia Orchestra
In December 2008, Nézet-Séguin made his first appearance with the Philadelphia Orchestra, at the invitation of Charles Dutoit. He returned for a second guest-conducting engagement in December 2009. In June 2010, he was named the eighth music director of the Philadelphia Orchestra, starting with the 2012–13 season. He served as music director-designate from 2010 to 2012. His initial contract as music director was for 5 seasons, with 7 weeks of scheduled concerts in the 2012–13 season, 15 weeks in the next 2 seasons, and 16 weeks in the subsequent 2 seasons of his Philadelphia contract. In January 2015, the orchestra announced a five-year extension of Nézet-Séguin's contract to the 2021–2022 season. In June 2016, the orchestra announced a further extension of his contract, through the 2025–26 season.  In February 2023, the orchestra announced a further extension of his contract, through the 2029-2030 season, along with a change in his title to music and artistic director.

Metropolitan Opera
Nézet-Séguin began annual appearances with the Metropolitan Opera in New York in 2009, making his début on 31 December 2009, conducting a new production of Carmen. There followed Don Carlo in 2010 and in 2015, Faust in 2011, La Traviata in 2013, and Rusalka in 2014. He opened the Met's 2015–16 season in September 2015 conducting a new production of Verdi's Otello, and returned in 2017 to conduct Der fliegende Holländer. On 2 June 2016, the Metropolitan Opera announced the appointment of Nézet-Séguin as the next music director, effective with the 2020–2021 season, with an initial contract of four years. He took the title of music director-designate as of the 2017–18 season.  In February 2018, the company announced that Nézet-Séguin would take the title of music director two years early, as of the 2018–2019 season, following the Met's termination of James Levine for sexual misconduct. On March 14, 2022, Nézet-Séguin and the Metropolitan Opera performed a charity concert for Ukraine in the wake of the Russian invasion of the country with all ticket and album sales and donations supporting war relief efforts  with Nézet-Séguin leading the Met Orchestra and Chorus and featuring sopranos Lise Davidsen and Elza van den Heever, mezzo-soprano Jamie Barton, tenor Piotr Beczała, bass-baritone Ryan Speedo Green and Ukrainian bass-baritone and Met Lindemann Young Artist Vladyslav Buialskyi, which was also recorded live for a digital release album on the Decca Classics and Deutsche Grammophon labels that included the Ukrainian national anthem,Valentyn Silvestrov’s "Prayer for Ukraine", Barber’s Adagio for Strings, "Va, Pensiero" from Verdi’s Nabucco, Strauss’s Four Last Songs and  Beethoven’s Symphony No. 9 in D Minor, Op. 125, "Choral": IV. Finale.

Other major engagements
Nézet-Séguin made his UK conducting debut with the Northern Sinfonia in the 2005–06 season. He debuted with the London Philharmonic Orchestra (LPO) in March 2007, and with the Scottish Chamber Orchestra in April 2007. In November 2007, the LPO appointed Nézet-Séguin as their principal guest conductor, starting with the 2008–09 season. Following a May 2010 extension of his contract as LPO principal guest conductor, he stood down from the post in 2014. He made his Royal Opera House debut with Rusalka, the first stagings of the opera at Covent Garden, in 2012.  He is also an honorary member and guest conductor of the Chamber Orchestra of Europe.

Personal life
Nézet-Séguin resides in Montreal and Philadelphia with his partner Pierre Tourville, a violist in the Orchestre Métropolitain. He has multiple pets, and has made a playlist on Spotify and Apple music for pets to listen to as part of his social media activities.

Honours
 Virginia Parker Prize (2000)
 Prix Opus (2005)
 Royal Philharmonic Society Young artists (2009)
 National Arts Centre Award, a companion award of the Governor General's Performing Arts Awards (2010)
 Doctorate honoris causa, UQAM (2011)
 Prix Denise-Pelletier, Government of the Province of Quebec (2011)
 Companion of the Order of Canada (2012)
 Doctorate honoris causa in music, McGill University, Montreal (2017)
 The Betty Webster Award, Orchestras Canada, Peterborough/Montreal (2020)
 Grammy Awards, winner in 2022 for Best Orchestral Performance "Price: Symphonies Nos. 1 & 3" and in 2023 for Best Classical Solo Vocal Album for Voice of Nature - The Anthropocene with soprano Renée Fleming and Nézet-Séguin as accompanist, Best Opera Recording: for Blanchard: Fire Shut Up in My Bones,  with The Metropolitan Opera Orchestra and The Metropolitan Opera Chorus  and nominated for Best Opera Recording: Aucoin: Eurydice, also with The Metropolitan Opera Orchestra and The Metropolitan Opera Chorus

Discography

Orchestral works
 Nino Rota, Concertos, Orchestre Métropolitain, ATMA Classique (2003)
 Glière, Saint-Saëns, Ravel, et al., Conversations, Orchestre Métropolitain, ATMA Classique (2003)
 Mahler, Symphony no. 4, Orchestre Métropolitain, ATMA Classique (2004)
 Beethoven, Haydn, Caldara, et al., Arianna a Naxos, Orchestre Métropolitain, ATMA Classique (2004)
 Arthur De Greef, Orchestral Works, Flemish Radio Orchestra, Klara (2004)
 Saint-Saëns, Symphony No. 3, Orchestre Métropolitain, ATMA Classique (2006)
 Bruckner, Symphony No. 7, Orchestre Métropolitain, ATMA Classique (2007)
 Debussy, Britten, Pierre Mercure, La mer (et al.), Orchestre Métropolitain, ATMA Classique (2007)
 Pierre Lapointe, En concert, Orchestre Métropolitain, Audiogram (2007)
 Beethoven, Symphony No. 3 & Richard Strauss, Death and Transfiguration, Rotterdam Philharmonic, RPhO (2008)
 Bruckner, Symphony No. 9, Orchestre Métropolitain, ATMA Classique (2008) 
 Beethoven, Violin Concerto, & Korngold, Violin Concerto, Renaud Capuçon (violin), Rotterdam Philharmonic, RPhO (2009)
 Bruckner, Symphony No. 8, Orchestre Métropolitain, ATMA Classique (2009)
 Ravel, Orchestral works, Rotterdam Philharmonic, EMI Classics (2009) 
 Tchaikovsky, et al., Fantasy: A Night at the Opera, Emmanuel Pahud (flute), EMI Classics (2010) 
 Brahms, A German Requiem, London Philharmonic Orchestra and Choir, LPO Ltd (2010)
 Berlioz, Symphonie fantastique, Rotterdam Philharmonic, BIS Records (2011)
 Florent Schmitt, La tragédie de Salomé, Orchestre Métropolitain, ATMA Classique (2011)
 Debussy, et al., Orchestre Métropolitain – 30 ans, Orchestre Métropolitain, ATMA Classique (2011)
 Richard Strauss, Ein Heldenleben & Vier letzte Lieder, with Dorothea Röschmann (soprano), BIS Records (2011)
 Bruckner, Symphony No. 4, Orchestre Métropolitain, ATMA Classique (2011) 
 Mahler, Symphony No. 5, The Philadelphia Orchestra (2011) 
 Bruckner, Symphony No. 6, Orchestre Métropolitain, ATMA Classique (2013) 
 various, Portraits: The Clarinet Album, with Andreas Ottensamer, Rotterdam Philharmonic, Virgin Classics (2013)
 Tchaikovsky, Symphony No. 6, Pathétique, Rotterdam Philharmonic, Deutsche Grammophon (2013)
 Stravinsky, Le Sacre du printemps, & Stokowski–Bach, Toccata and Fugue in D minor, BWV 565, The Philadelphia Orchestra, Deutsche Grammophon (2013)
 Mahler, Das Lied von der Erde, London Philharmonic Orchestra, LPO Ltd (2013)
 Joaquín Rodrigo & de Falla, Concertos, with Miloš Karadaglić (guitar), London Philharmonic Orchestra, LPO Ltd (2014)
 Robert Schumann, The (Four) Symphonies, Chamber Orchestra of Europe, Deutsche Grammophon (2014)
 Rachmaninov, Rachmaninov Variations, Rhapsody on a Theme of Paganini, Op.43, Daniil Trifonov (piano), The Philadelphia Orchestra, Deutsche Grammophon (2015)
 Dvorak, Dvorak: Othello Overture - Symphony Nos. 6 & 7,, London Philharmonic Orchestra (2017)
 Mendelssohn, Symphonies 1–5, Chamber Orchestra of Europe and RIAS Kammerchor, Deutsche Grammophon (2017)
 Prokofiev, VISIONS OF PROKOFIEV, Romeo and Juliet, Op.64, Violin Concerto No.1 in D Major, Op.19, Cinderella, Op.87, Violin Concerto No.2 in G Minor, Op.63, The Love For Three Oranges, Op.33, Chamber Orchestra of Europe, Deutsche Grammophon (2018)
 Bernstein, Mass, The Philadelphia Orchestra, Deutsche Grammophon (2018)
 Rachmaninov, Destination Rachmaninov: Departure, Piano Concertos 2&4, Daniil Trifonov (piano), The Philadelphia Orchestra, Deutsche Grammophon (2018) 
 Mozart, Piano Concerto No.20, K.466, Seong-Jin Cho (piano), Chamber Orchestra of Europe, Deutsche Grammophon (2018)
 Florence Price, Florence Price: Symphonies Nos. 1 & 3, The Philadelphia Orchestra, Deutsche Grammophon (2021)
 Mahler, Symphony No. 10, Orchestre Métropolitain, ATMA Classique ACD2 2711 (recorded 2014, released 2015)
 De Sabata, Suite Op. 2, Juventus, La notte di Plàton, Gethsemani, The Philadelphia Orchestra, Deutsche Grammophon (2023)

Vocal recitals
 Kurt Weill, Lieder, Diane Dufresne (soprano), Orchestre Métropolitain, ATMA Classique (2005)
 Mozart, Lieder, Suzie LeBlanc (soprano), Nézet-Séguin (piano), ATMA Classique (2006)
 Puccini, et al., Marc Hervieux (tenor), Orchestre Métropolitain, ATMA Classique (2010)

Operas
 Gounod, Roméo et Juliette, Mozarteum Orchestra Salzburg (Salzburg Festival), Deutsche Grammophon (2008)
 Mozart, Don Giovanni, Mahler Chamber Orchestra, Deutsche Grammophon (2012)
 Mozart, Così fan tutte, Chamber Orchestra of Europe, Deutsche Grammophon (2013)
 Mozart, Die Entführung aus dem Serail, Chamber Orchestra of Europe, Deutsche Grammophon (2015)
 Mozart, Le nozze di Figaro, Chamber Orchestra of Europe, Deutsche Grammophon (2016)
 Mozart, La Clemenza di Tito, Chamber Orchestra of Europe, Deutsche Grammophon (2018)
 Mozart, Die Zauberflöte, Chamber Orchestra of Europe, Deutsche Grammophon (2020)

Operas on video
 Bizet, Carmen, Metropolitan Opera, Deutsche Grammophon (2010)
 Dvorák, Rusalka, Metropolitan Opera, Decca Classics (2014)
 Gounod, Faust, Metropolitan Opera, Decca Classics (2014)

See also

References

External links
 Official website (in English and French)
 Orchestre Métropolitain du Grand Montréal biography
 Askonas Holt agency biography
 Biography at the Canadian Encyclopedia
 "Yannick Nézet-Séguin — A Soaring Talent" by Wah Keung Chan, La Scena Musicale, 1 February 2000 (in English and French).
 Philadelphia Orchestra page on Nézet-Séguin
 Interview at Classical WETA 90.9 FM
 Governor General's Performing Arts Awards Foundation, "Yannick Nézet-Séguin: 2010 National Arts Centre Award", biography

1975 births
Living people
French Quebecers
Westminster Choir College alumni
Male conductors (music)
Canadian classical pianists
Male classical pianists
Canadian gay musicians
Musicians from Montreal
Musicians from Philadelphia
LGBT classical musicians
Companions of the Order of Canada
21st-century Canadian conductors (music)
Governor General's Performing Arts Award winners
21st-century American musicians
21st-century classical pianists
Music directors of the Philadelphia Orchestra
Deutsche Grammophon artists
21st-century Canadian male musicians
Grammy Award winners
21st-century Canadian LGBT people